WDEV (550 kHz) is a commercial AM radio station in Waterbury, Vermont.  Programming is simulcast on WDEV-FM (96.1 MHz) licensed to Warren, Vermont.  The stations' studios and offices are located near U.S. Route 2 in Waterbury.  WDEV also operates two translator stations, W243AT (96.5 FM), licensed to Barre, Vermont, and W252CU (98.3 FM), licensed to Montpelier, Vermont.  WDEV can also be heard on a privately owned translator, W270BR (101.9 FM), licensed to Island Pond, Vermont.  The stations are owned by Radio Vermont, Inc., and air a full service radio format, including news, talk, sports and different genres of music.

History 
WDEV first signed on the air on July 16, 1931.  It is one of Vermont's earliest stations, going on the air after WVMT Burlington and WSYB Rutland.  WDEV had been owned by the Squier family and their company, Radio Vermont Group, since 1935.  Lloyd Squier owned the station from 1935 until his death in 1979, and passed it to his son, NASCAR broadcaster Ken Squier.

In 1966, one year after The Sound of Music was released, the von Trapp family broadcast a public concert on WDEV from the family's lodge in Stowe, Vermont.

In 1991, Squier bought WDOT in Warren and changed its call sign to WDEV-FM.  The FM station serves mainly to improve WDEV's coverage, particularly at night when the AM side must power down to 1,000 watts in order to protect other regional stations on the frequency such as WGR in Buffalo, New York, which likewise flips to a directional pattern to protect WDEV.

A 2003 article, in Harper's magazine, cited WDEV as one of the best examples of independent radio broadcasting in the United States.

In April 2017, Squier announced he had put the Radio Vermont stations up for sale, citing his age. On October 1, 2017, Squier turned the station over to Steve Cormier, who served as Radio Vermont's sales manager. The terms of the sale allow Squier to continue to have any role at the station he pleases. In October 2020, WDEV began soliciting donations from listeners.

Translators 
In addition to the main station, WDEV is relayed by several translators.

Programming

News and talk
WDEV's news programming consists of several talk shows along with three major newscasts per day.  The station's morning drive time program is called The Morning News Service, and the afternoon drive-time show is called The Afternoon News Service, with an additional newscast that airs at noon called The Midday News Service. The morning and afternoon news consist of local, state, and national news, in addition to interviews with reporters from WCAX-TV, Vermont's CBS affiliate, and VTDigger.org, an investigative news site. All newscasts feature a weather update from Roger Hill, the station's meteorologist.  Week day programming features several local talk shows that span the political spectrum. Vermont radio veteran Ric Cengeri hosts “Vermont Viewpoint,” from 9-11, followed by Bill Sayer’s “Common Sense Radio”, a conservative talk show.  Early afternoons include “Equal Time Radio” with Traven and “The Vermont Conversation” with David Goodman. Most of the talk programming, including Democracy Now!, are brokered.  WDEV also carries the audio of the Channel 3 WCAX-TV 11pm newscast.

On weekends, a three-hour newscast starts Saturday mornings, along with a half hour newscast at noon.  On Sundays, CBS News Sunday Morning, Face The Nation, 60 Minutes, Jill on Money and the CBS News Weekend Roundup are heard.

Music
WDEV's music programming consists of several different genres that air throughout the week.  On weekday afternoons, “The Getaway” is heard, a country/rock music program hosted by Greg Hooker. WDEV also airs a nightly jazz program, hosted by James Atherlay, unless the station is airing a sports game during that time. WDEV's weekend programming is made up almost entirely of music. Vermont broadcasting veteran Joel Najman hosts “The Great American Music Hall” on weekend middays.

Sports
WDEV features sports updates during all three of its newscasts. During the Morning News Service, Mal "The Sammie" Boright has sports updates, and during the Midday and Afternoon News Services James Atherlay delivers the sports report. Atherlay then goes on to host Score, Sports Talk and Rock. On Tuesday afternoons, Ken Squier is joined by Jasper Goodman, who goes on to talk about local, regional, and national sports, including the Red Sox during the MLB season.

WDEV is an affiliate of the Boston Red Sox and New England Patriots Radio Networks.  WDEV carries all regular-season and postseason Red Sox games.  The station also broadcasts Norwich University men's ice hockey and select Vermont high school basketball and football games. WDEV also airs auto racing from Thunder Road International SpeedBowl in Barre, Vermont, when there is no other programming conflict. WDEV's other Motorsports programming, when there is no conflict, includes Monster Energy NASCAR Cup Series events.  Part of Sunday and each overnight, WDEV carries ESPN Radio.

The Trading Post
The Trading Post is hosted Monday through Saturday by Lee Kittell after the Morning News Service.  People call in or write in with three items or less (and only one car, unless the others are free or a parts car) to advertise them to the listening public.

Music to Go to the Dump By
"Music to Go to the Dump By" is a roughly one-hour radio comedy program that airs each Saturday morning on WDEV, hosted by Jack Donovan, with semi-regular contributions from Farmer Dave, who has run since 2002 on the "Undecided Cow Party" ticket for governor of the state, among other guest hosts.

It consists of odd songs, jokes the readers send in, banter between Donovan and Farmer Dave, and running gags involving cows. As Donovan also hosts the outlaw country show that leads out of Music to Go to the Dump By, he will frequently allow the show to spill out into the next hour.

The songs tend to be weird, and are an eclectic mix of rare recordings, novelty songs, home recordings sent in, dog music (and obligatory equal-time cat music), cow music from Mylo Hatzenbuhler, and a selection of comedy songs (most of them from country artists such as John Prine, Ray Stevens, Homer and Jethro or Bobby Bare), along with outsider and parody/cover selections from artists such as Mrs. Miller and Jonathan and Darlene Edwards. Each episode ends with a closing hymn, a farcical number loosely related to religion and to whatever sport is in season (such as Bare's "Drop Kick Me Jesus" during football season or Randy Brooks's  "Will You Be Ready at the Plate When Jesus Throws the Ball?"—or the cover version by Brooks's collaborator Dr. Elmo—during baseball season).

Squier hosted the program from the late 1960s to November 2020. "Music to Go to the Dump By" was, for several years, "hosted" by Buster the Wonder Dog (Squier's real-life pet border collie), with Squier serving as "faithful companion." Under that format, the show would start off with Ken talking to himself and Buster, apparently not noticing he is on the air. He talked to Buster as though he were a person; Buster makes no noise other than lapping at his water bowl and eating. After a few minutes, Ken "realizes" that he's on the air, states the episode number (which he apparently makes up on the spot) and cuts to the theme song. In March 2008, Buster died, putting this show on hiatus until later in the year. Since then, it has been dedicated to Buster and to Marie, a local stage venue proprietor who had suggested the show's concept to Squier.

In November 2020, Squier was diagnosed with a severe case of COVID-19, forcing him to take an extended leave of absence from the show. Steve Cormier initially planned to put the show on hiatus in January 2021 before fan feedback prompted him to reverse course and keep the show on the air. After a lengthy rehabilitation, Squier recovered from the long-term sequelae of the illness by April 2021 and resumed appearing on the program, calling in each week from his home; he has not appeared since mid-2021.

References

External links

DEV
Radio stations established in 1931
1931 establishments in Vermont
Full service radio stations in the United States